Eospilarctia guangdonga is a moth of the family Erebidae first described by Vladimir Viktorovitch Dubatolov, Yasunori Kishida and Min Wang in 2008. It is found in Guangdong, China.

References

Moths described in 2008
Spilosomina